Spirit of the Black Territory Bands is an album by the American musician Johnny Otis, credited as Johnny Otis and His Orchestra. It was released in 1992. The album is a tribute to the music of the territory bands of Otis's youth; Otis played with several such bands in the 1940s.

The album was nominated for a Grammy Award, in the "Best Large Jazz Ensemble Performance" category.

Production
The album was produced by Otis and Tom Morgan. Otis's son, Shuggie, played guitar and helped to arrange the songs. His other son, Nicky, played drums. Otis employed a 10-piece horn section. The album was largely made up of Count Basie and Duke Ellington songs. The album cover is a painting by Otis.

Critical reception

The San Francisco Chronicle wrote that "the arrangements lay curling, fine-point filigree behind blasting individual efforts with a prevailing robust spirit that simply smokes."

AllMusic deemed the album "competent but hardly thrilling." The Penguin Guide to Blues Recordings noted Otis's "continued engagement with jazz," and concluded that "it's unlikely that swing fans will be disappointed."

Track listing

References

1992 albums
Arhoolie Records albums